Shōgun: The Musical is a musical with a book and lyrics by John Driver and music by Paul Chihara.

Based on James Clavell's 1976 novel and the 1980 television mini-series of the same name based on it, the musical centers on shipwrecked English sea captain John Blackthorne, who finds himself drawn into a political power play while involved in an illicit affair with a married noblewoman in 17th-century Japan. Clavell's novel was itself originally inspired by the true story of English navigator William Adams.

History
Clavell himself initiated the project in 1982 and, when it remained in limbo for more than eight years, finally provided most of the financing required to get it mounted. Compressing his mammoth work, which had required twelve hours to tell fully on screen, into a reasonable length for the theatre proved to be a daunting task. When the production opened at the Kennedy Center in Washington, D.C., it closely resembled Les Misérables and The Phantom of the Opera in size and scope, with a cast of thirty-eight characters, more than three hundred costumes, a libretto nearly entirely sung, and a running time of 3½ hours. Critics and audiences alike had difficulty following the convoluted plot, and it was decided to cut much of the music and replace it with dialogue. Composer Chihara objected and was dismissed. The leading man Peter Karrie was also let go and was replaced by Philip Casnoff, who had auditioned for the role but was rejected by producers who deemed him too young and too American.

A revamped, considerably shorter show arrived in New York City. At the press preview shortly before the official opening night, Casnoff was struck by a piece of scenery in the middle of the second act, and the performance abruptly ended. His injuries were minor, and after a brief recuperation period he returned to the show.

After eighteen previews, the Broadway production, directed and choreographed by Michael Smuin, opened on November 20, 1990 at the Marquis Theatre, where it ran for 72 performances. In addition to Casnoff, the cast included June Angela, Joseph Foronda, Eric Chan, JoAnn M. Hunter, Leslie Ishii, and Francis Ruivivar.

Despite a detailed plot synopsis in the Playbill, audiences were still confused by the action onstage. Critics found the special effects (including a shipwreck, an earthquake, and a battle fought on horseback in a snowstorm) and Patricia Zipprodt's costume designs to be impressive, but the score was weak and Smuin, whose background was ballet, had concentrated more on unnecessary dance sequences than he had on plot exposition. Japanese visitors kept the show running for two months, but when the Persian Gulf War broke out, tourism dropped dramatically and the production closed.

Songs

Act I
 Karma
 Night of Screams
 This is Samurai
 How Nice to See You
 Impossible Eyes
 He Let Me Live
 Honto
 Assassination
 Shogun
 Royal Blood
 An Island
 No Word for Love
 Mad Rum Below/Escape
 Karma (Reprise)
 Born to Be Together

Act II
 Fireflies
 Sail Home
 Rum Below
 Pillowing
 Born to Be Together (Reprise)
 No Man
 Cha-No-Yu
 Absolution
 Poetry Competition
 Death Walk
 One Candle
 Ninja Raid
 One Candle (Reprise)
 Winter Battle
 Resolutions
 Trio
 Finale

Awards and nominations
Tony Award for Best Actress in a Musical (Angela, nominee)
Tony Award for Best Costume Design (nominee)
Drama Desk Award for Outstanding Actress in a Musical (Angela, nominee)
Drama Desk Award for Outstanding Costumes (winner)
Theatre World Award (Ruivivar, winner)

References
Not Since Carrie: Forty Years of Broadway Musical Flops by Ken Mandelbaum, published by St. Martin's Press (1991), pages 185-86\

External links
 
New York Times review
Time Magazine review

Compositions by Paul Chihara
1990 musicals
Broadway musicals
Musicals based on television series
Musicals based on novels
Musicals based on multiple works